Kolashta Jan (also Romanized as Kolashtā Jān and Koleshtājān; also known as  Kolashtjān and Kulushtladzhan) is a village in Baz Kia Gurab Rural District, in the Central District of Lahijan County, Gilan Province, Iran. At the 2006 census, its population was 805, in 257 families.

References 

Populated places in Lahijan County